Ezekiel 41 is the forty-first chapter of the Book of Ezekiel in the Hebrew Bible or the Old Testament of the Christian Bible. This book contains the prophecies attributed to the prophet/priest Ezekiel, and is one of the Books of the Prophets. The Jerusalem Bible refers to the final section of Ezekiel, chapters 40-48, as "the Torah of Ezekiel". This chapter continues Ezekiel's vision of a future Temple.

Text
The original text was written in the Hebrew language. This chapter is divided into 26 verses.

Textual witnesses
Some early manuscripts containing the text of this chapter in Hebrew are of the Masoretic Text tradition, which includes the Codex Cairensis (895), the Petersburg Codex of the Prophets (916), Aleppo Codex (10th century), Codex Leningradensis (1008). Fragments containing parts of this chapter were found among the Dead Sea Scrolls, that is, 4Q73 (4QEzek; 50–25 BCE) with extant verses 3–6.

There is also a translation into Koine Greek known as the Septuagint, made in the last few centuries BCE. Extant ancient manuscripts of the Septuagint version include Codex Vaticanus (B; B; 4th century), Codex Alexandrinus (A; A; 5th century) and Codex Marchalianus (Q; Q; 6th century).

The sanctuary (41:1–4)
Ezekiel is brought into the "sanctuary", or nave/main room in the temple, which length and width are the same as in Solomon's temple, but no mention of the height. There is apparently no altar of incense, lamps, or other parts that were in the former temple  f.

Verse 1
 Then he brought me into the sanctuary and measured the doorposts,
 six cubits wide on one side and six cubits wide on the other side—the width of the tabernacle.
 The vision was given on the 25th anniversary of Ezekiel's exile, "April 28, 573 BCE".
 "Sanctuary" (Hebrew היכל): here "the main room of the temple", sometimes called the "holy place" (compare )
 Septuagint doesn't have "–the width of the tabernacle" (lit. "the tent"); it is found in Hebrew texts.

Verse 4
 He measured the length, twenty cubits; and the width, twenty cubits, beyond the sanctuary;
 and he said to me, “This is the Most Holy Place.”
 Ezekiel did not enter the Most Holy Place, because he is just a priest, not the high priest, and only the high priest can enter that room, once a year, on the day of atonement.

The side buildings (41:5–15a)
This part starts a series of passages providing more information for the previous short description; the original account will continue in f. The details of the arcades or side-chambers (Verses 5–7) are unclear, but seem to match the pattern of Solomon's temple.

Verse 9
The thickness of the outer wall of the side chambers was five cubits, and so also the remaining terrace by the place of the side chambers of the temple.
"The remaining terrace" is translated "that which was left" in the King James Version, "the free space" in the New Revised Standard Version. Jamieson, Fausset and Brown note that there was unoccupied space in Solomon's Temple which the Kings of Judah had used for horses dedicated to the sun, and that in Ezekiel's visionary temple there was to be no space which was not sacred to the Lord.

The design inside (41:15b–26)
This section describes the interior design inside the temple; the details are obscure. In this addition, the interior of the Most Holy Place or the Holy of Holies is described openly unlike in the previous part.

See also

New Jerusalem Dead Sea Scroll
Solomon's Temple
Third Temple
Related Bible parts: 1 Kings 6, 2 Chronicles 3, Isaiah 2, Ezekiel 40, Revelation 21

Notes

References

Sources

External links

Jewish
Ezekiel 41 Hebrew with Parallel English
Ezekiel 41 Hebrew with Rashi's Commentary

Christian
Ezekiel 41 English Translation with Parallel Latin Vulgate

41